Michael Saywell (born 27 August 1942) is a British equestrian. He competed in two events at the 1972 Summer Olympics.

References

External links
 

1942 births
Living people
British male equestrians
Olympic equestrians of Great Britain
Equestrians at the 1972 Summer Olympics
Sportspeople from Lincolnshire